Ian McCann is an Australian former professional rugby league footballer who played in the 1980s and 1990s. He played for Balmain and Penrith in the NSWRL competition.

Playing career
McCann made his first grade debut for Balmain in round 13 of the 1989 NSWRL season against Eastern Suburbs at the Sydney Football Stadium. McCann made one further appearance that year in round 16 against North Sydney. McCann would make 32 appearances for the Balmain club over four years before joining Penrith in 1993. 

He made his club debut for Penrith in round 2 against Canberra, coming off the bench, and would be starting lock the next week. He would hold a spot in first grade until round 5, and returning for two more appearances later in the season.

References

Penrith Panthers players
Balmain Tigers players
Year of birth missing (living people)
Australian rugby league players
Rugby league centres
Living people